David Coburn (born October 31, 1969) is an American actor. He is best known as the voice of Captain Planet in the TV series Captain Planet and the Planeteers.

Early life
Coburn was born in Los Angeles, California on October 31, 1969, the day of Halloween.

Career
At the age of ten, he made his acting career debut as Ted Loomis in the television series One Day at a Time (1979–1981).

He went on to voice Captain Planet in the hit animated television series Captain Planet and the Planeteers, which ran for 113 episodes. 

He reprised the role in the crossover episode of OK K.O.! Let's Be Heroes.

Personal life
He has lived in Paris, France, since 2011.

Filmography
 1979–1981: One Day at a Time (TV series) (Ted Loomis)
 1980: Facts of Life (Carl on the December 17, 1980 episode "Who Am I?")
 1980: Diff'rent Strokes (Jimmy)
 1980: The Jazz Singer (Bar Mitzvah Boy)
 1984: Pole Position (TV series) (voice of Dan Darret)
 1986: Born American (K.C.)
 1989: The Fabulous Baker Boys (Kid at Vet)
 1989: Gross Anatomy (voice)
 1989: Growing Pains (Doug)
 1990: New Kids on the Block (TV series) (voice; Nikko and Donnie Wahlberg)
 1990: Growing Pains (David - 2 episodes)
 1990–1996: Captain Planet and the Planeteers (TV series) (voice; Captain Planet/Captain Pollution)
 1991: Star Trek: The Next Generation (Brower in "The Nth Degree")
 1991–1993: Harry and the Hendersons (TV series) Walter Potter
 1992: The Fountain Clowns (Boxer)
 1992: Defenders of Dynatron City (TV short) (voice of Toolbox)
 1994: Where on Earth Is Carmen Sandiego? (TV Series) (voice of Lee Jordan)
 1994–1999: Sister, Sister (TV Series) (Claude)
 1995: Live Shot (TV series) (Rick Evers)
 1995: Space Strikers (TV series) (voice of Captain Nemo)
 1996: Insomnia (Additional Voices)
 1998: To Hell with Love (Alan Rigatelli)
 1999: Babylon 5: A Call to Arms (TV movie) (Minbari Ranger)
 1999: Can of Worms (TV movie) (voice of Jarm)
 1999: Screenplay (TV Movie) (Bobby)
 2002: Pinocchio (voices; Carabiniere No. 1, Carabiniere No. 3, Undertaker Rabbit, Warder)
 2002: Asterix & Obelix: Mission Cleopatra (voice; Asterix)
 2003: Manhunt (voice; Innocentz)
 2004: Def Jam: Fight for NY (voice; Cruz)
 2004: Grand Theft Auto: San Andreas (voice; Pedestrian)
 2006: Neverwinter Nights 2 (voices; Baalbisan, Annaeus Spirit, Darmon)
 2006: The Sopranos (Bartender in "Mr. & Mrs. John Sacrimoni Request...")
 2011–2013: Platane (David Coburn, a film producer)
 2013: Beyond: Two Souls (video game) Stan, Ricky (voice & performance capture)
 2013: Mars: War Logs (video game) (voice; Roy)
 2014: Blue Estate: The Game (video game) (voices; Mauro, Various Gangsters)
 2015: Zip Zip (TV Series) (voices; Washington, Mitch)
 2016: Furi (video game) (voice; The Scale)
 2017: OK K.O.! Let's Be Heroes (TV series) (voice; Captain Planet)
 2018: Detroit: Become Human (video game) (voice; Richard Perkins)
 2019: Alice (Lawyer)
 2019: My Life in Versailles (voice; Mr. Angel)
 2019: Anna (CIA Chief)
 2019: Blacksad: Under the Skin (video game) (voice; John Smirnov)
 2019: Alt-Frequencies (video game) (voice; Ennis B)
 2021: Alfred Hitchcock - Vertigo (video game) (voice; Nick Reyes)
 2022: Vampire: The Masquerade - Swansong (video game) (Additional Voices)

References

External links

1969 births
Living people
American expatriates in France
American male child actors
American male film actors
American male television actors
American male video game actors
American male voice actors
Male actors from Los Angeles
20th-century American male actors
21st-century American male actors